Starting Over Is Japanese J-pop girlband Speed's debut studio album released on May 21, 1997. It contains three singles: "Body & Soul", "Steady" and "Go! Go! Heaven" respectively. The album was hugely successful entering the Oricon Albums Charts weekly charts at number 1 for three consecutive weeks.

Track listing
 Walk This Way
 Body & Soul
 Luv Vibration
 STEADY
 RAKUGAKI
 
 Go! Go!  Heaven
 I Remember
 Kiwi Love
 Happy Together
 Starting Over
 Starting Over: Walk This Way (Reprise)

References

Speed (Japanese band) albums
1997 debut albums